The San Bernardino Pride was a baseball club who played in the Senior Professional Baseball Association in 1990 for the league's second season. They played its home games at Fiscalini Field in San Bernardino, California.

Former Baltimore Orioles infielder Rich Dauer was the playing manager of the Pride, while Tom Thompson served as the bench coach for the team.  The best-known names on the roster were Vida Blue, the 1971 American League MVP and Cy Young Award winner, and Mike Norris, a 22-game winner for the 1980 Oakland Athletics. Other players included Derrel Thomas, who played for seven teams during a 15-year major league career, as well as the brothers Gary and Ron Roenicke.

The Pride also had its version of Bo Jackson in outfielder Anthony Davis, a two-sport star at the University of Southern California, where he earned three national championships in baseball and two in football, before playing as a running back in the WFL, the CFL, the NFL, and the USFL.

The Pride had a record of 13-12 and were in third place when the league canceled the season on December 26, 1990. An apparent rift between teams owners forced cancellation of all remaining games. At the time, the teams had not quite reached the halfway point in a planned 56-game schedule.

Notable players

Kim Allen
Vida Blue
Rich Dauer
Anthony Davis
Joe Decker
Roger Erickson
Bill Fleming
Ed Glynn
Rudy Law
Mike Norris
Bob Owchinko
Jim Pankovits
Leon Roberts 
Gary Roenicke
Ron Roenicke
Lenn Sakata
Dave Skaggs
Derrel Thomas
John Urrea
U L Washington
Jim Willoughby

Sources

Sports in San Bernardino County, California
Senior Professional Baseball Association teams
Defunct baseball teams in California
1990 establishments in California
1990 disestablishments in California
Baseball teams established in 1990
Baseball teams disestablished in 1990